Sitka is an unincorporated community in Washington County, in the U.S. state of Ohio.

History
A post office called Sitka operated between 1890 and 1916. The community was named after Sitka, Alaska, where a local mother's son had drowned while serving in the U.S. Army. This individual was Joseph T. Bukey, and according to a history of Washington County, Ohio published less than a decade later was serving in Alaska at the time of his accidental drowning.

References

Unincorporated communities in Washington County, Ohio
Unincorporated communities in Ohio